Gafanha da Encarnação is a village and a civil parish of the municipality of Ílhavo, Portugal. The population in 2011 was 5,362, in an area of 10.98 km2.

References

Freguesias of Ílhavo